L.E.T.H.A.L. Ladies: Return to Savage Beach, sometimes credited under just the subtitle, is a 1998 action film written and directed by Andy Sidaris, a sequel to Sidaris' Day of the Warrior. It features the return of much of the original cast, including Marcus Bagwell reprising the role as Warrior but this time working on the side of the L.E.T.H.A.L. Ladies, as well as the addition of former Playboy Playmate Carrie Westcott as the mysterious Sofia. It's the twelfth and to date, the last of a series of films informally called the Triple-B (Bullets, Bombs and Babes or Bullets, Bombs and Boobs) series, which began in 1985 with Malibu Express. It was also Sidaris' final film before his death.

This time around the L.E.T.H.A.L. Ladies must retrieve a stolen computer disk containing the location of a hidden treasure trove.

Cast
 Julie Strain as Willow Black 
 Rodrigo Obregón as Rodrigo Martinez 
 Julie K. Smith as  Cobra 
 Cristian Letelier as J. Tyler Ward 
 Shae Marks as Tiger 
 Marcus Bagwell as Warrior 
 Carrie Westcott as Sofia 
 Paul Logan as Doc Austin 
 Gerald Okamura as Fu 
 Ava Cadell as Ava 
 Carolyn Liu as Silk 
 Kevin Eastman as Harry the Cat 
 Marcus Young as Lead Kabuki/Lead Ninja 
 David Hopper as Ninja #2
 Jeff McMahen as Ninja #3
 Chuck Tam as Kabuki #2 
 Lelagi Togisala as Kabuki #3
 Jefferson Hendricks as Guard

Former Sheriff Harold M. Terry, a marksman from Sidaris's native Caddo Parish, Louisiana, was the weapons advisor on the film.

See also
 Girls with guns

References

External links
 
 L.E.T.H.A.L. Ladies: Return to Savage Beach on NanarLand

1998 films
1990s spy films
American sequel films
Films directed by Andy Sidaris
Girls with guns films
American spy action films
1990s American films